Sir David Paul Brandes Goldberg  is a British academic and social psychiatrist, born Hampstead, London in 1934. He trained at the Maudsley Hospital in South London under Sir Aubrey Lewis and Sir Michael Shepherd before taking a Professorship in Manchester. He later returned to the Maudsley to run the Institute of Psychiatry at King's College London.

Best known for his epidemiological work on psychiatric morbidity in the community, he has been a long-term advisor to the World Health Organization.

References 

British psychiatrists
Year of birth missing (living people)
Place of birth missing (living people)
Living people